L-methionine:oxidized-thioredoxin S-oxidoreductase may refer to:
 Methionine-S-oxide reductase
 L-methionine (S)-S-oxide reductase